"My World Is Empty Without You" is a 1965 song recorded and released as a single by the Supremes for the Motown label.

Overview
Written and produced by Motown's main production team of Holland–Dozier–Holland, the song's fast tempo accompanies a somber lyric which delves into the feelings of depression which can set in after a breakup.

"My World Is Empty Without You" was one of the few songs written by the team for the Supremes to not reach number 1, peaking at number 5 on the US pop chart for two weeks in February 1966 and at number 10 on the R&B chart; the single failed to chart on the UK Singles Chart. The group performed the song on the CBS hit variety program The Ed Sullivan Show on Sunday, February 20, 1966.

Billboard described the song as being "right in their pulsating rhythm groove of 'I Hear a Symphony' with even more excitement in the performance."  Cash Box described it as a "throbbing, rhythmic soulful tearjerker about a love-sick girl who spends her days carrying the torch for her ex-boyfriend."

In the view of pop historian Andrew Grant Jackson, the Rolling Stones' later song "Paint It Black" bears a strong resemblance to "My World Is Empty Without You."

Personnel
Lead vocals by Diana Ross
Background vocals by Mary Wilson and Florence Ballard
Instrumentation by the Funk Brothers and the Detroit Symphony Orchestra:
Earl Van Dyke – organ
James Gittens – piano
James Jamerson – bass
Benny Benjamin – drums
Joe Messina – guitar
Jack Ashford – vibraphone
Mike Terry – baritone saxophone
Paul Riser – string arrangements

Charts

Weekly charts

Year-end charts

Certifications

References

External links
 List of "My World Is Empty Without You" cover versions at SecondHandSongs.com
 

1965 songs
1965 singles
1991 singles
The Supremes songs
Stevie Wonder songs
Songs written by Holland–Dozier–Holland
Song recordings produced by Brian Holland
Song recordings produced by Lamont Dozier
Motown singles
Baroque pop songs
Songs about heartache